is a former Japanese football player.

Career

Early career
Born in Fukushima, Honda began his professional career with Júbilo Iwata in the J1 League, where he stayed for three seasons before signing for Buriram United F.C. in the Thai Premier League. In 2013, Honda was loaned out to Bangkok Glass who play in the same league where he stayed till July.

Dempo
On 21 August 2013 it was confirmed that Honda had signed for Dempo S.C. of the Indian I-League; thus completing the club's foreign-player quota before the season began.

However, on 6 January 2014 it was confirmed that Honda had been released by Dempo.

Club statistics

References

1990 births
Living people
Association football people from Fukushima Prefecture
Japanese footballers
J1 League players
Júbilo Iwata players
Shinnosuke Honda
Shinnosuke Honda
Dempo SC players
Association football defenders
Shinnosuke Honda
Expatriate footballers in Thailand
Expatriate footballers in India
Japanese expatriate sportspeople in India